Major General Luis Raul Esteves (April 30, 1893 – March 12, 1958) was the Puerto Rican military officer who commanded the United States military forces that in 1950 carried out airstrikes and shelled the towns of Jayuya and Utuado in his own native Puerto Rico.

He was the first Puerto Rican and the first American citizen of Hispanic heritage to graduate from the United States Military Academy (West Point), and the founder of the Puerto Rico National Guard that attacked the two towns. Of his West Point class, that included Dwight Eisenhower, Omar Bradley, Joseph McNarney, James Van Fleet and George E. Stratemeyer, Esteves was the first to achieve the rank of general.

Early years
Esteves was born Luis Raul Esteves y Völckers in Aguadilla, Puerto Rico on April 30, 1893. His father and mother were also natives of Aguadilla. His father, Francisco Esteves Soriano had served in the Spanish Army and his mother, Enedina Völckers Van der Dijs, of German and Dutch descent, was a housewife. His father, had also served as mayor of Aguadilla. Esteves  received his primary education in the local grammar school and went to high school in Mayagüez, Puerto Rico.

At the outbreak of the Spanish–American War, the Esteves Völckers family welcomed the Americans as an alternative to Spanish rule of the island. Esteves's father wanted his son to continue the family military tradition and encouraged him to consider a military career. However, his mother had other plans. She wanted her son to become an engineer and to study in the United States. The family's financial situation did not permit her to realize her dream.

Esteves saw a news advertisement announcing examinations for the entry into the United States Military Academy at West Point, New York and applied without his parents' knowledge. He passed the exam, was accepted to and eventually graduated from West Point, thus becoming the first Puerto Rican to do so.

West Point

While at West Point he tutored Dwight D. Eisenhower in Spanish, as a second language was required in order to graduate. In 1915, Esteves graduated with Eisenhower and Omar Bradley among his classmates, and was the first Puerto Rican graduate of the academy. He was later the first graduate of 1915, "the class the stars fell on", to reach the rank of general. One of the problems that Esteves faced upon his graduation was that in order to become an officer in the U.S. Army he had to be a citizen of the United States and Puerto Ricans at the time were not. The War Department was able find a precedent when they remembered that during the American Revolutionary War, foreign officers like Gilbert du Motier, Marquis de Lafayette and Friedrich Wilhelm von Steuben were given commissions in the Continental Army. He obtained the rank of Second Lieutenant and was assigned to the 23rd Infantry Regiment, where he worked in the National Matches of Florida.

Pancho Villa incident
Esteves served as a 2nd lieutenant in the 8th Infantry Brigade of the U.S. Army under the command of General Pershing, when he was sent to El Paso, Texas during the "Pancho Villa Incident". During the onset of the Battle of Columbus in June 1916, Esteves was promoted to first lieutenant. He was given charge of infantry units and assigned to protect bridges. From El Paso, he was sent to the town of Polvo, Mexico. After being transferred to the town of Polvo, the population named him mayor and judge during his stay.

Puerto Rico National Guard
Esteves was then promoted to the rank of captain. 
Esteves helped organize the 23rd Battalion, which was composed of Puerto Ricans and was stationed in Panama during World War I. Esteves was later assigned command of a machine gun company and a battalion. He was sent to Camp Las Casas and the Henry Barracks in Puerto Rico and served as an instructor in the preparation of Puerto Rican Officers for the Porto Rico Regiment of Infantry (which in 1919 was renamed the 65th Infantry).

He saw a need for a Puerto Rican National Guard. Esteves pressured colonial governor Arthur Yager and the colonial legislature about the necessity of a local militia. His request was met with approval. The National Guard Bureau approved this initiative, and on July 19, 1919, the current incarnation of the PRNG was organized. In 1918, he was promoted to Major and by 1919, the first regiment of the Puerto Rico National Guard was formed. After the war, Esteves was sent to Washington, D.C., however his assignment there was cut short and he resigned his commission in the Regular Army because of a medical admonition that residence in a cold climate could have been fatal to his wife. Esteves joined the new entity on February 25, 1920, as commander of the First Battalion of the First Puerto Rico Regiment and its companies. On February 7, 1939, Esteves was named Adjutant General. He was responsible for funneling an increase of new recruits at Camp Tortuguero. In 1942, Esteves was given command of the temporary State Guard. 

On October 15, 1940, the Puerto Rico National Guard was activated pursuant to Executive Order 3551. Esteves was promoted to the rank of Brigadier General and ordered to active duty and given the command of the 92nd Infantry Brigade. He commanded the 92nd until he was summoned by José Miguel Gallardo the Interim Governor of Puerto Rico to organize a State Guard, with the Army's approval, that in a short time consisted of nine well trained and equipped regiments. On June 22, 1946, Esteves was awarded with the Legion of Merit by the Military Department of the Antilles. During this time, he reorganized the Puerto Rico National Guard and held the position of Adjutant General until his retirement in June 1957.

On October 30, 1950, the Puerto Rican Nationalist Party organized a series of uprisings in numerous cities in Puerto Rico against the United States rule and the Puerto Rican commonwealth government in what is known as the Puerto Rican Nationalist Party Revolts of the 1950s. The Puerto Rico National Guard was mobilized under the command of Esteves by orders of Governor Luis Muñoz Marín and U.S. Brigadier Gen. Edwin L. Sibert, and sent to confront the Nationalists in various towns such as Jayuya, Utuado and San Juan.

Later years
General Esteves' main hobby was studying military history.  He also published two books, Los Barrabases and ¡Los Soldados Son Así! (Soldiers are like that). In ¡Los Soldados Son Así!, he tells about many anecdotes, jokes, and stories of the Boricua (Puerto Rican) soldiers, covering the period from when the ancient regiment from Puerto Rico was organized (which today is the 65 Infantry) up to the Second World War. He also authored Cosas de Viajero and Cosas de Soldados.

Esteves married Guadalupe Navarro, with whom he had four children, Raúl, Roberto, Maricel and Vernon. Esteves also helped establish the first two theaters in Aguadilla, his hometown, with the help of fellow community leader Juan Garcia. On April 30, 1957, Esteves retired from service due to health concerns. On March 12, 1958, Esteves died in Santurce as a complication of these issues. His remains are interred in Cementerio Histórico Urbano de Aguadilla. On August 24, 1958, the PRNG's Armory was re-baptized in his honor. On May 11, 1962, Division General Juan Cordero dedicated a speech to him during the re-inauguration of the PRNG's Military Museum.

The former Puerto Rico National Guard Armory in Hato Rey, Puerto Rico "Gen. Luis R. Esteves" and the street in front of the Puerto Rico National Guard's headquarters in Old San Juan, Puerto Rico was renamed "La Calle Gen. Esteves" in his honor.

Military awards and decorations
Among Major General Luis R. Esteves' military decoration and awards are the following:

See also

 List of Puerto Ricans
 List of Puerto Rican military personnel
 Puerto Ricans in World War I
 Puerto Ricans in World War II
 Puerto Rico Adjutant General
 65th Infantry
 German immigration to Puerto Rico

Notes

References
Citations

Bibliography

External links

Generals of World War II

1893 births
1958 deaths
United States Army Infantry Branch personnel
United States Army personnel of World War I
American military personnel of World War I
National Guard (United States) generals
People from Aguadilla, Puerto Rico
Puerto Rican military officers
Puerto Rico Adjutant Generals
Puerto Rican Army personnel
Recipients of the Legion of Merit
United States Army generals
United States Military Academy alumni
Puerto Rican people of German descent
Puerto Rican people of Dutch descent
Puerto Rico National Guard personnel
Graduates of the United States Military Academy Class of 1915
Puerto Rican expatriates in Mexico
United States Army generals of World War II